Jem Garrard is a British-Canadian director, screenwriter, and producer. Garrard is the creator and showrunner on the space opera series Vagrant Queen released in 2020, and the award winning mockumentary webseries Android Employed, which ran from 2017 to 2018. They directed the fourth series of comedy-drama You Me Her in 2019, and episodes of Wynonna Earp and Motherland: Fort Salem. Garrard has been nominated for a daytime Emmy award for Mech-X4 and won a Leo Award in 2018.

Jem Garrard identifies as queer and non-binary. They live in Vancouver, BC with their family.

Filmography

Awards and nominations

References

External links
 

British television directors
British television writers
British science fiction writers
Canadian television directors
Canadian women television directors
British women television writers
Year of birth missing (living people)
Living people